In continuum mechanics, a Mooney–Rivlin solid  is a hyperelastic material model where the strain energy density function  is a linear combination of two invariants of the left Cauchy–Green deformation tensor . The model was proposed by Melvin Mooney in 1940 and expressed in terms of invariants by Ronald Rivlin in 1948.

The strain energy density function for an incompressible Mooney–Rivlin material is

For an incompressible material, .

Derivation
The Mooney–Rivlin model is a special case of the generalized Rivlin model (also called polynomial hyperelastic model) which has the form

For a compressible Mooney–Rivlin material  and we have

If  we obtain a neo-Hookean solid, a special case of a Mooney–Rivlin solid.

For consistency with linear elasticity in the limit of small strains, it is necessary that

Cauchy stress in terms of strain invariants and deformation tensors
The Cauchy stress in a compressible hyperelastic material with a stress free reference configuration is given by

For a compressible Mooney–Rivlin material,

Therefore, the Cauchy stress in a compressible Mooney–Rivlin material is given by

It can be shown, after some algebra, that the pressure is given by

The stress can then be expressed in the form

The above equation is often written using the unimodular tensor  :

Thus

Since  the Cayley–Hamilton theorem implies

Hence, the Cauchy stress can be expressed as

where

Cauchy stress in terms of principal stretches
In terms of the principal stretches, the Cauchy stress differences for an incompressible hyperelastic material are given by

For an incompressible Mooney-Rivlin material,

Therefore,

Since . we can write

Then the expressions for the Cauchy stress differences become

Uniaxial extension
Then the true stress (Cauchy stress) differences can be calculated as:

Simple tension

In the case of simple tension, .  Then we can write

and the engineering stress (force per unit reference area) for an incompressible Mooney–Rivlin material under simple tension can be calculated using
.  Hence

If we define

then

The Mooney–Rivlin solid model usually fits experimental data better than Neo-Hookean solid does, but requires an additional empirical constant.

Equibiaxial tension
If, in addition, the material is incompressible then . The Cauchy stress differences may therefore be expressed as

The equations for equibiaxial tension are equivalent to those governing uniaxial compression.

Pure shear
A pure shear deformation can be achieved by applying stretches of the form 

The Cauchy stress differences for pure shear may therefore be expressed as

Therefore

For a pure shear deformation

Therefore .

Simple shear
The deformation gradient for a simple shear deformation has the form

where  are reference orthonormal basis vectors in the plane of deformation and the shear deformation is given by

In matrix form, the deformation gradient and the left Cauchy-Green deformation tensor may then be expressed as

Therefore,

The Cauchy stress is given by

For consistency with linear elasticity, clearly  where  is the shear modulus.

Rubber
Elastic response of rubber-like materials are often modeled based on the Mooney–Rivlin model.  The constants  are determined by fitting the predicted stress from the above equations to the experimental data.  The recommended tests are uniaxial tension, equibiaxial compression, equibiaxial tension, uniaxial compression, and for shear, planar tension and planar compression.  The two parameter Mooney–Rivlin model is usually valid for strains less than 100%.

Notes and references

See also
 Hyperelastic material
 Finite strain theory
 Continuum mechanics
 Strain energy density function

Continuum mechanics
Non-Newtonian fluids
Rubber properties
Solid mechanics